was a Japanese politician of the Liberal Democratic Party, a member of the House of Councillors in the Diet (national legislature). A native of Yoshinogawa, Tokushima and graduate of University of Tokushima, he was elected to the House of Councillors for the first time in 2004 and re-elected for a second term in 2010, both times running on the Liberal Democratic proportional list. He was parliamentary secretary for Internal Affairs and Communications during the realigned Fukuda and Asō cabinets from 2008 to 2009.

References

External links 
 Official website in Japanese.

Members of the House of Councillors (Japan)
1943 births
2013 deaths
Liberal Democratic Party (Japan) politicians